Kabir Khan  is an Indian film director, screenwriter and cinematographer who works in Hindi cinema. He started his career working in documentary films, and then made his feature film directorial debut in 2006 with  Kabul Express. He is best known for directing Ek Tha Tiger (2012) and Bajrangi Bhaijaan (2015). His latest film 83 was released in (2021).

He is the board member of Mumbai Academy of the Moving Image.

Early life and background
Khan was born to Rasheeduddin Khan, a Muslim Urdu Speaking father and Leela Narayan Rao, a Hindu Telugu-speaking mother. Rasheeduddin, who was a Pathan hailing from Kaimganj in Farrukhabad district, Uttar Pradesh, was a nephew of Dr. Zakir Hussain (President of India – 1967 to 1969) and a communist politician favored by Indira Gandhi as a nominated member of the Rajya Sabha at a relatively young age, in the early 1970s. He was also a professor of political science, and in the early 1970s, he became one of the founding professors of Jawaharlal Nehru University. His sister, Anusheh, is the wife of film-maker Vijay Krishna Acharya, director of films like Tashan and Dhoom 3. 

Khan studied at Kirori Mal College of Delhi University, as well as Jamia Millia Islamia in Delhi. He is married to television host & actress Mini Mathur, with whom he has 2 children, Vivaan and Sairah. 

In initial days, he worked with prominent journalist like Saeed Naqvi. Before becoming a full time film maker he has worked as a camera man and director with Saeed Naqvi and travelled across the globe to cover international issues.

Film career 
Khan started his career at age 25 as a cinematographer for the Discovery Channel documentary film Beyond the Himalayas (1996) directed by Gautam Ghosh. He then made his own directorial debut with the documentary The Forgotten Army (1999) based on Subhas Chandra Bose's Indian National Army. He then directed two more documentaries before shifting his focus to mainstream cinema.

Khan debuted through the Yash Raj Films-backed Kabul Express, which gained him the Indira Gandhi Award for Best Debut Film of a Director at the 54th National Film Awards. He then went on to direct two more films with Yash Raj Films, namely New York and Ek Tha Tiger. While Kabul Express was a below average performer, both New York and Ek Tha Tiger led him to mainstream success.

After his 3-film deal with Yash Raj Films ended, Khan set up his own production company, and ventured into mainstream screenwriting with Bajrangi Bhaijaan, which is his most-successful film to date, and has been the third highest-grossing Indian film globally. The film garnered the National Film Award for Best Popular Film Providing Wholesome Entertainment at the 63rd National Film Awards. After the success of Bajrangi Bhaijaan, he directed Katrina Kaif and Saif Ali Khan in Phantom, an all-out actioner based on the 26/11 attacks.

Khan again collaborated with Salman on Tubelight, an official remake of the 2015 American film Little Boy, which was based in the backdrop of the 1962 Sino-Indian war and marked the debut of Chinese actress Zhu Zhu, with a worldwide release in June 2017. The film, just like the original, met with negative reviews, but was slightly better received due to Salman's performance and the direction. Later, in 2019, his first web series, The Forgotten Army: Azaadi Ke Liye, a 5-episode original based on Subhas Chandra Bose's Azad Hind Fauj, released on Amazon Prime Video. The series has a different premise from his 1999 documentary of the same name.

His next film is The Zookeeper, a Sino-Indian production. It is a travel-related drama film which is being shot in the Chinese city of Chengdu and the surrounding region.

In the end of 2021, his long-awaited film 83, was released. It is based on India's historic victory at the 1983 Cricket World Cup, in which Ranveer Singh plays the role of Kapil Dev, the Captain of the Indian Cricket Team. It received widespread critical acclaim.

Filmography

Frequent collaborations

Awards and nominations

References

External links 

 

1968 births
Living people
Hindi-language film directors
Indian male screenwriters
Indian documentary filmmakers
Indian people of Pashtun descent
Kirori Mal College alumni
Delhi University alumni
Film directors from Hyderabad, India
Discovery Channel people
21st-century Indian film directors
Film producers from Hyderabad, India
Director whose film won the Best Debut Feature Film National Film Award
Directors who won the Best Popular Film Providing Wholesome Entertainment National Film Award
Jamia Millia Islamia alumni
Screen Awards winners